YUL Condominiums is a large residential skyscraper complex in Montreal, Quebec, Canada. The towers are located on René-Lévesque Boulevard at the corner of Bishop and Mackay, near E-Commerce Place and the Bell Centre.

YUL Condominiums also included the construction of 17 townhouses on Overdale Avenue. The promoter of the project is Kheng Ly of Brivia Group.

References

External links

 

Residential skyscrapers in Canada
Skyscrapers in Montreal
Downtown Montreal
Residential condominiums in Canada